The Wiregrass Farmer is reported to be the second newspaper created by Irish immigrant Joe Lawrence.

Lawrence, a devout Christian, moved his family from Ireland to the United States in the late 19th century. After arriving in New York, he headed south, eventually settling in south central Georgia in the community which later became Ashburn.

Lawrence's first attempt at a newspaper was a religious publication, according to subsequent stories told about him by his daughter Nora Lawrence Smith. No copies of  Lawrence's first paper, if it ever existed, have surfaced.

There is reason to doubt the stories of Miz Nora, as she was called, because among other stories, she told of leading her family's covered wagon through the woods at night with a lantern. The time frame she gave for this would have her being about two or three years old at most, considering her stated birthday. Miz Nora, for reasons no one really knows, postdated the first edition of The Wiregrass Farmer and Stockman to 1899 in subsequent editions of the paper by changing its volume number. It is believed that Lawrence's religious paper was published in 1899, and she included those editions as part of The Wiregrass Farmer.

The first actual Wiregrass Farmer and Stockman was published on the last Saturday in March 1902. It has remained in business ever since, publishing an issue each week. The newspaper serves as the official Legal Organ for Turner County and the cities of Ashburn, Rebecca, and Sycamore.

The University of Georgia has microfilmed copies of extant editions on file at the Athens campus in the Newspaper Project archives. These records are often sought out by genealogy hounds researching their families. Most of the microfilmed editions at the UGA Athens Campus may also be viewed at the Victoria Evans Memorial Library in Ashburn. Bound volumes of the newspaper begin in the 1940s with significant gaps which grow smaller as the volumes approach more recent times.

In 1924, the Wiregrass Farmer won the "Sutlive Trophy" as the newspaper that did the greatest service to its community. In 1931, also received the "Bankston Trophy"  for giving the best local news.

Joe Lawrence and unnamed partners were the first owners. The Wiregrass was later owned by Nora Lawrence Smith and business manager F.M. Tison. The paper was sold to a friend of Smith's. It was later sold to Trib Publications, the present owner.

The Wiregrass Farmer has had five managing editors in its more than 100 years: Lawrence, Smith, Austin Saxon, Dave Taylor (for a six-month period), and present managing editor and publisher Ben Baker, who has worked for the paper since 1994.

References

External links
 The Wiregrass Farmer home page

Newspapers published in Georgia (U.S. state)